Two human polls make up the 2021–22 NCAA Division II men's basketball rankings, the AP Poll and the Coaches Poll, in addition to various publications' preseason polls.

Legend

D2SIDA Poll

NABC Coaches Poll

See also
2021–22 NCAA Division II women's basketball rankings

References